Grim Tales is a British children's television program based on fairy tales by the Brothers Grimm, featuring Rik Mayall as a storyteller dressed in pyjamas and a dressing gown. The twenty-two episodes were broadcast on ITV (series 1) and Channel 4 (series 2) from 1989 to 1991. There was also a release on video and audio cassette, with the slightly different title Grimm Tales.

Synopsis
Mayall tells the tales in his own inimitable way from his armchair, designed by David Barrington Holt, complete with paws and ostrich legs. The set was designed by building designer Julian Cripps. The stories are usually interspersed with animation, often fairly abstract, and are directed by Bob Baldwin, with music by composed by Ged Haney and arranged by Clive Bell.

The stories were adapted by Anne Caulfield and Anthony Horowitz.

Episodes

Series 1 (1989)

Series 2 (1991)

References

External links
 
 
 
  IMDb.com : Bob Baldwin

1989 British television series debuts
1991 British television series endings
1980s British children's television series
1990s British children's television series
British children's fantasy television series
ITV children's television shows
Channel 4 original programming
Television shows based on fairy tales
British television shows featuring puppetry
Television series by ITV Studios
Television shows produced by Central Independent Television
British television series with live action and animation
Works based on Grimms' Fairy Tales
English-language television shows